Mutual Savings Life provides life insurance products, annuities, and other insurance products to individuals and businesses. Founded in 1927 in Decatur, Alabama, Mutual Savings is 100% owned by Primesco, a company founded for the purpose of acquiring Mutual Savings.

In April 2008, Primesco was acquired by Unitrin and the Mutual Savings policies are now serviced by its Career Agency Group.

In August 2011, Unitrin Inc. changed its name to Kemper Corp.

See also
Life insurance

External links 
Unitrin Company Website
Unitrin Announces Agreement to Acquire Primesco, Inc.
Mutual Savings Company Website (Old)
Unitrin Changes Name to Kemper

Life insurance companies of the United States
Mutual insurance companies of the United States
Companies based in Decatur, Alabama
American companies established in 1927
Financial services companies established in 1927